Muriba is a ward in Tarime District, Mara Region of northern Tanzania, East Africa. In 2016 the Tanzania National Bureau of Statistics report there were 11,985 people in the ward, from 10,861 in 2012.

Villages / neighborhoods 
The ward has 4 villages and 19 hamlets.

 Muriba
 Biasinda
 Kebose
 Keryoba
 Kumwika
 Kumwika Senta
 Tagare
 Isarara
 Mekoma
 Muriba
 Rechuma
 Tagare
 Bungurere
 Bugucha
 Bungurere Senta
 Ikoro
 Kebononari
 Kogesangora
 Kobori
 Gukinisya
 Kobori Senta
 Kwiriba
 Nyantare

References

Tarime District
Mara Region